The Savannah Port Terminal Railroad  is a terminal railroad that began operations on June 9, 1998, taking over track operations from the Savannah State Docks Railroad.  It operates about 23 miles of track and handles about 46,000 cars annually. The owner is Genesee & Wyoming Inc.

References

External links
Savannah Port Terminal Railroad official webpage - Genesee and Wyoming website
Rail GA

Georgia (U.S. state) railroads
Switching and terminal railroads
Genesee & Wyoming